State Route 153 (SR 153) is a state highway in Chattanooga, Tennessee. It runs from Interstate 75/U.S. Route 74 (I-75/US 74) a few miles east of the I-24 interchange, to US 27 just south of Soddy-Daisy. The route serves as a bypass around downtown Chattanooga for I-75 travelers heading towards US 27 north. It is also an important route for drivers from Soddy-Daisy, Hixson, and other parts of northwestern Hamilton County who are heading for I-75 and the eastern half of the county. It is also an important link to the Tennessee Valley Authority Chickamauga Dam, which the highway crosses on the Wilkes T. Thrasher Bridge. It also serves as the primary access to the Chattanooga Metropolitan Airport.

Route description
SR 153 begins in Chattanooga as a six-lane freeway at a stack interchange with I-75 in Chattanooga, just north of its interchange with I-24. SR 153 then goes west to have a diamond interchange with US 11/US 64/SR 2 (Lee Highway) before turning northwest. It then has a diamond interchange with Sheperd Road and then another with Shallowford Road a short distance later, which both provide access to Chattanooga Metropolitan Airport. It continues northwest to a diamond interchange with Jersey Pike, then a partial cloverleaf interchange with SR 317 (Bonny Oaks Drive) a half mile later. It then has another partial cloverleaf with SR 17/SR 58, with SR 58 becoming concurrent with SR 153. They then have a partial cloverleaf with SR 319 (Amnicola Highway), the route narrows to four lanes and SR 58 separates and turns west. SR 153 then crosses the Tennessee River/Chickamauga Dam on the Wilkes T. Thrasher Bridge on top of the dam. SR 153 then widens to a six-lane divided highway once again and becomes an at-grade arterial route and enters Hixson. It then has a partial diamond interchange with SR 319 (Dupont Parkway) once again, this time becoming concurrent with it. They then pass and provide access to Northgate Mall, Chattanooga's second and oldest continuously-operating mall. SR 319 (Hixson Pike) then separates once again at a partial cloverleaf interchange, and SR 153 continues northwest through a major retail district. SR 153 then turns north and leaves Hixson and ends at US 27/SR 29 at a partial cloverleaf interchange, with the road continuing as Dayton Pike into Soddy Daisy.

Junction list

References

Transportation in Hamilton County, Tennessee
Transportation in Chattanooga, Tennessee
153
Freeways in Tennessee